Adauto is a given name. Notable people with the name include:

Adauto Iglesias (1928-1991), Spanish football goalkeeper and manager
Adauto Domingues (born 1961), Brazilian middle distance runner
Adauto (footballer) (born 1980), Brazilian football striker
Adauto Neto (born 1980), Brazilian football attacking midfielder

See also 

Masculine given names